Viktor Grigoryevich Vershinin (3 December 1928 – September 1989) was a Soviet cyclist. He was part of the Soviet team that finished sixth in the road race at the 1956 Summer Olympics, though he did not score. He finished in 35th place in the individual road race. In 1956, he won the Peace Race in the team competition.

References

1928 births
1989 deaths
Soviet male cyclists
Olympic cyclists of the Soviet Union
Cyclists at the 1956 Summer Olympics
Cyclists from Moscow